Novajidrány is a country village in northern Hungary.

References

Populated places in Borsod-Abaúj-Zemplén County